is a Japanese female professional wrestler, who wrestles for Tokyo Joshi Pro Wrestling.

She is also known for her appearances in Chikara, Consejo Mundial de Lucha Libre, DDT Pro-Wrestling and All Elite Wrestling.

Professional wrestling career

Tokyo Joshi Pro Wrestling (2013–present)
She made her ring debut with Miyu Yamashita against Chikage Kiba and Kanna as a dark match of "DDT World Expo-Progress and Harmony in pro wrestling" held at Ryogoku Kokugikan on August 17, where she was pinned by Kanna. Nakajima was part of the main event of Tokyo Joshi's first Korakuen Hall event, where she and Miyu Yamashita fought to become the inaugural Princess of Princess Champion. Taking place on January 4, 2016, Yamashita was able to pin Nakajima to claim the title.

From September 9, 2017, to October 10, Nakajima teamed with Yuka Sakazaki to take part in a tournament to crown the inaugural Princess Tag Team Championship. In the tournament final, they defeated Maho Kurone and Rika Tatsumi. Calling themselves the MiraClians, they made two successful title defences before losing the titles to Azusa Christie and Sakisama on February 3, 2018.

On May 3, 2019, at Yes! Wonderland 2019 ~ Opportunity Is There ~, Nakajima defeated Miyu Yamashita for the Tokyo Princess of Princess Championship.

All Elite Wrestling (2019, 2020)
On July 13, 2019, Nakajima made her debut for All Elite Wrestling at Fight for the Fallen where she would team with Bea Priestley to defeat Britt Baker and Riho. Nakajima returned to AEW Dark, being defeated by AEW Women's World Champion Riho on February 11 2020.

Consejo Mundial de Lucha Libre (2019)
In November 9, 2019, Nakajima made her Consejo Mundial de Lucha Libre (CMLL) debut in a six-women tag team match with La Jarochita and Sanely losing to Dalys la Caribeña, La Amapola and Reyna Isis.

Championships and accomplishments 
 DDT Pro Wrestling
 DDT Ironman Heavymetalweight Championship (1 time)
Pro Wrestling Illustrated
 Ranked No. 29 of the top 150 female wrestlers in the PWI Women's 150 in 2022
 Tokyo Joshi Pro Wrestling
 Princess of Princess Championship (2 times)
 Princess Tag Team Championship (1 time) – with Yuka Sakazaki
Princess Tag Team Championship Tournament (2017) – with Yuka Sakazaki
 Princess Cup (2015)
Spring Beautiful One Day Tournament (2020)

References

External links
 
 

1991 births
Living people
Japanese female professional wrestlers
People from Niigata (city)
21st-century professional wrestlers
Ironman Heavymetalweight Champions